Elmar Hess (born 5 October 1966 in Hamburg) is a German artist.

His work includes film and video art, photography, installation and objects. Hess interprets interpersonal conflicts as a result of systemic pressure. Often an individual event is brought to mind in the context of historical events.

Life 

Hess' youth is marked by visits to the southern English coast. The proximity to the British overseas ports led him to develop a strong passion for transatlantic ships. Although this topic is not the focus of his work, his works–especially film–reflect countless details and often metaphoric imagery.

From 1988, Hess studied at the Stuttgart State Academy of Arts and the Academy of Fine Arts in Hamburg and attended the classes of Katharina Sieverding and Franz Erhard Walther. From 1998 to 2000 he studied Film at the University of Hamburg by Michael Ballhaus and others. Since 2010 he has been teaching at the Academy of Fine Arts, Saarbrücken/GER.

Ellmar Hess lives and works in Berlin.

Work

"War Years" 

Elmar Hess, who has an outwardly apparent similarity to the U.S. actor Orson Welles, directed his artistic debut work in 1996. In his film "War Years", he styled a relationship crisis, a World War II.

A huge kitchen table turns into a battlefield on which quarreling lovers, staged in allusion to the meeting between Winston Churchill (Hess mimes) and Adolf Hitler.

Like many details in a surreal film event, the film is to be experienced from the narrative perspective of a large model ship that is involved in the turmoil of war. The film focuses on the media handling of the serious German heritage, breaking taboos: images and sounds, figures, landscapes and architecture of the Nazi dictatorship and World War II fade into the storyline of the film with a character of many.

In almost playful manner Nazi and Allied war strategies are identified as historical fund with scenes from a private relationship clinch. The relationship drama put the "War Years " as a tableau of social landscape in a soulless world: People are pressed into the intellectual cross transitions of serious seeming commentary voices and appear involved in the gluttonous machinery of a war that is raging in the vacuum between the social, historical and collateral relations.

"Freedom is not for free" 

In Hess' installation "Freedom is not for free" from 2006, the theme of his work is similar to "War Years", ending a conflict of love in front of the tribunal of a human rights committee. The case is a troubadour of grotesque stereotypes and behavior against better knowledge. Behind the individual drama the work traces a vision of society in which the fulfillment of human aspirations through lobbying and manipulation is prevented by the media.

As in most current work of Elmar Hess video sequences like in "Freedom is not for free" are in the center of his installation in which objects, photographs and records of private origin are connected with historical events. The battle of the sexes mutates into the confrontation between the two superpowers during the Cold War. Acting as historical figures acquaintances were kit out by Hess before he photographed them in known poses. Treating his friends ironically deceptively similar, Hess overstates politicians such as John F. Kennedy, Che Guevara, Mao Tse-tung, Willy Brandt and other prominent partners of the policy of the Iron Curtain. In his productions he refers repeatedly to the "wild" 1960s, in which he sees sexual taboos coded by power struggles in social dimension.

Selected exhibitions
 1994, "Lost Paradise", Kunstraum Wien – Museumsquartier, Wien/AT
 1996, "Kriegsjahre – Some sunny day we’ll meet again", Kunstverein Hamburg, Germany
 1997, Internationales Video festival Mediopolis, Berlin, Germany
 1997, "Surfing Systems", Kunstverein Kassel, Germany
 1998, Balticum Video-Festival
 1998, Filmfest Hamburg, Germany
 1999, "Video und Lebensart", Galerie der Gegenwart, Kunsthalle Hamburg, Germany
 1999, "German Open – Gegenwartskunst in Deutschland", Kunstmuseum Wolfsburg, Germany
 2000, "Ticker", Galerie Gebauer, Berlin, Germany
 2000, Internationales Filmfest Moskau, Russia
 2001, Internationale Kurzfilmtage Oberhausen, Germany
 2001, "Fact-Fiction", Edith-Russ-Haus für Medienkunst, Oldenburg, Germany
 2002, "Sehsüchte", Filmfestival Potsdam, Germany
 2003, "MIPDOC", Cannes, France
 2003, Nordische Filmtage, Lübeck, Germany
 2004, "Weiße Nächte Kiel Oben", Kunsthalle Kiel, Germany
 2005, "Videothek", Galerie der Stadt Wels/AT
 2006, "SNAFU – Medien , Mythen, Mind Control", Hamburger Kunsthalle, Germany
 2007, "Fish and Ships", Barlach Halle Hamburg, Germany
 2008, "Seestücke – Von Max Beckmann bis Gerhard Richter", Hamburger Kunsthalle, Germany
 2008, "art Karlsruhe", Germany
 2009, "Expanded Realities", Gallery of the City of Pecs/CZ
 2009, "Man Son 1969 – Schrecken der Situation", Hamburger Kunsthalle, Germany
 2010, "Man Son", Villa Merkel, Esslingen, Germany
 2011  "The End of the Dream", Tresorfabrik, Berlin
 2011  "cis", Blau – Raum für Kunst, Hamburg
 2012  "Surf & Anarchie & Alchemie – Metaphorik und produktive Missverständnisse", Hamburger Kunsthalle
 2012  "The Golden Cage", Kunst Büro Berlin (cat.)
 2013  "La Mère Perdue", Saarländische Galerie – Europäisches Kunstforum, Berlin
 2013  "STILLS", Gallery Whiteconcepts, Berlin
 2013  "Money Works", Gallery Whiteconcepts, Berlin (cat.)

Scholarships and awards 
 1996 Award of the International Videofestival Berlin "Mediopolis", Berlin, Germany
 1996/97 Scholarship of the Hochschule für Bildende Künste Hamburg, Germany
 1997 Scholarship "New Art in Hamburg" with a stay in London
 1998/99 Scholarship of the German Kunstfonds
 2002 Scholarship of the Werkleitz-Society, Germany
 2003 Scholarship of the county Niedersachsen, Germany
 2004 Project funding of the Freie und Hansestadt Hamburg, Germany
 2005 Project funding of the Michael-Liebelt-Foundation, Germany
 2006 Scholarship of the German Academy Rom Villa Massimo, Germany
 2007 Scholarship of the Foundation Schöppingen, Germany
 2008 Project funding of the Rudolf-Augstein-Foundation, Germany
 2008 Project funding "Hamburgische Kulturstiftung", Germany
 2009 Project funding of the Alfred-Toepfer-Foundation, Germany
 2010 Project funding of the Abt-Straubinger-Stiftung, Stuttgart, Germany
 2012 Rudolf Augstein Stiftung project grant, Hamburg
 2012 Schering Stiftung project grant, Berlin
 2013 Stiftung Kunstfonds grant, Bonn

References 
 Elmar Hess: „Kriegsjahre“, Verlag der Buchhandlung Walther König, Cologne, Germany
 Elmar Hess: „Freedom is not for free“, Kerber Verlag, Bielefeld, Germany
 Frank Barth/ Dirck Möllmann in "MAN SON 1969 – Vom Schrecken der Situation", Hamburger Kunsthalle, Germany
 Veit Görner/ Nikolaus v. Wolff in "German Open – Gegenwartskunst in Deutschland"; Cantz Verlag, Stuttgart, Germany
 Barbara Steiner in "Lost Paradise", Oktagon Verlag, Stuttgart, Germany
 Regine Gerhardt in "Seestücke – Von Max Beckmann bis Gerhard Richter", Hirmer Verlag, Munich, Germany
 Markus Brüderlin in "Kunstraum Wien – Projekte 1994–96", Triton Verlag, Wien, Austria
 Martin Hentschel in "Passage"; Kerber Verlag, Bielefeld, Germany

External links 
 http://www.elmarhess.com
 https://web.archive.org/web/20110927225219/http://www.hamburger-kunsthalle.de/sammlungav/html_sammlung/h/hess_1999_11.html
 https://web.archive.org/web/20110927225246/http://www.hamburger-kunsthalle.de/manson/catalog/hess.htm
 https://web.archive.org/web/20120406223255/http://www.villamassimo.de/de/stipendiaten/5003969d1c11c3f3d.html
 https://web.archive.org/web/20110927225330/http://www.hamburger-kunsthalle.de/snafu/seiten/10.htm
 http://www.edith-russ-haus.de/index.php/Programm/FactFiction
 https://web.archive.org/web/20120425051049/http://www.kuenstlerstaette-bleckede.de/bleckede_html/jubi/bericht_Elmar_Hess.pdf

German contemporary artists
Living people
Mass media people from Hamburg
German multimedia artists
1966 births